Last of the Summer Wine's second series originally aired on BBC1 between 5 March and 16 April 1975. All episodes from this series were written by Roy Clarke and produced and directed by Bernard Thompson.

Although ratings from the first series were not good, the BBC ordered a second series of Last of the Summer Wine after the first season aired but were delayed due to strike action. The second series was eventually produced and aired during March and April 1975. For the first time, series 2 saw two episodes make it into the top ten programs of the week, starting with the opening show, "Forked Lightning," which was watched by over 18 million people.

Joining the cast this season was Joe Gladwin as Wally Batty, Nora Batty's henpecked husband. Series 2 would also mark the final appearance of Blamire, played by Michael Bates, who left at the end of the series due to health problems.

The second series was released on DVD in region 2 as a combined box set with series 1 on 2 September 2002.

Outline
The trio in this series consisted of:

First appearances

Wally Batty (1975–1987)

Last appearances

Cyril Blamire (1973–1975)

Episodes

DVD release
The box set for series 1 and 2 was released by Universal Playback in September 2002.

Notes

References

See also

External links
Series 2 at the Internet Movie Database

Last of the Summer Wine series
1975 British television seasons